Borjigin Vanchinbalyn Gularans (1820–1851) was a Mongolian poet, and the elder brother of the famous poet, novelist and translator Vanchinbalyn Injinash.

External links 
Pre-revolutionary Mongolian literature

Mongolian poets
1820 births
1851 deaths
19th-century poets
19th-century Mongolian poets